This list is of the Historic Sites of Japan located within the Prefecture of Shimane.

National Historic Sites
As of 1 July 2021, sixty Sites have been designated as being of national significance; the San'indō and Tsuwano Domain Kamei Clan Graves with the Grave of Kamei Korenori span the prefectural borders with Tottori.

Prefectural Historic Sites
As of 24 June 2021, fifty-nine Sites have been designated as being of prefectural importance.

Municipal Historic Sites
As of 1 May 2020, a further one hundred and fifty-seven Sites have been designated as being of municipal importance.

See also

 Cultural Properties of Japan
 Iwami Province
 Izumo Province
 Oki Province
 Shimane Museum of Ancient Izumo
 List of Places of Scenic Beauty of Japan (Shimane)
 List of Cultural Properties of Japan – paintings (Shimane)

References

External links
  Cultural Properties of Shimane Prefecture
  Historic Sites of Shimane Prefecture

Shimane Prefecture
 Shimane